Anenii Noi District  is a district (raion) in the central part of Moldova. As of 1 January 2011, its population was 83,100. Its seat is the city of Anenii Noi.

History
Localities with the oldest documentary attestation are Gura Bîcului, Teliţa, Mereni localities documented for the first time in 1443–1475. In the following centuries to develop the economy (trade, agriculture, customs duties), and shows a significant demographic growth. The first documentary of the city Anenii Noi is June 27, 1731, with the name Pascani pe Bîc. In 1812, after the Russo-Turkish War (1806-1812), is the occupation of Basarabia, Russian Empire during this period (1812-1917), there is an intense russification of the native population. In 1918 after the collapse of the Russian Empire, Bessarabia united with Romania in this period (1918-1940, 1941-1944), the district is part of the Chişinău County. In 1940 after Molotov-Ribbentrop Treaty, Basarabia is occupied by the USSR. In 1991 as a result of the proclamation of Independence of Moldova, part and residence of the Chişinău County (1991-2003), and in 2003 became administrative unit of Moldova.

Geography

Anenii Noi District is located in the central part of Moldova. Neighborhood has the following district: Criuleni District in north, east Grigoriopol District, Căuşeni District in south, Ialoveni District and Municipality of Chişinău in the west. Flat relief, the plain. Altitudes range from 30 m in the Lower Nistru plain, to 200–250 m in the hills of northern district. Erosion processes with a low intensity.

Climate
Temperate continental climate with annual average temperature +10 C, July average temperature +22 C, January average yearly precipitation -4 c. Yearly precipitation 500–600 mm. Average wind speed 3–5 m\s.

Fauna
Fauna typical of central Europe this mammals such as foxes, hedgehogs, deer, wild boar, ermine, ferret and more. Of birds: owl, stork, hawk, sparrow, starling, crow, egret, partridges and others.

Flora
Forests occupy 10.7% of the district and are complemented by oak, english oak, hornbeam, maple, linden, ash and others. From plants: wormwood, black, clover, knotweed, nettle, fescue and more.

Rivers
Anenii Noi District is located in the Nistru river basin, which crosses the district in the east. The most important tributary of this is Bîc River (155 km). It is the third largest natural lake in Moldova.

Administrative subdivisions
Anenii Noi District has 1 town, 25 communes and 19 villages.

Cities 
 Anenii Noi

Communes and villages 

 Botnăreşti
 Salcia
 Bulboaca
 Calfa
 Calfa Nouă
 Chetrosu
 Todireşti
 Chirca
 Botnăreştii Noi
 Ciobanovca
 Balmaz
 Mirnoe
 Troiţa Nouă
 Cobusca Nouă
 Cobusca Veche
 Floreşti
 Delacău
 Floreni
 Geamăna
 Batîc
 Gura Bîcului
 Hîrbovăţ
 Maximovca
 Mereni
 Merenii Noi
 Ochiul Roş
 Picus
 Puhăceni
 Roşcani
 Speia
 Şerpeni
 Teliţa
 Teliţa Nouă
 Ţînţăreni
 Creţoaia
 Varniţa
 Zolotievca
 Larga
 Nicolaevca

Demographics
1 January 2012 the district population was 83,100 of which 10.3% urban and 89.7% rural population

Births (2010): 988 (11.9 per 1000)
Deaths 2010): 1018 (12.3 per 1000)
Growth rate (2010): -30 (-0.4 per 1000)

Ethnic groups 

Footnote: * There is an ongoing controversy regarding the ethnic identification of Moldovans and Romanians.

Religion 

Christians – 96.7%
Orthodox Christians – 95.6%
Protestant – 0.9%
Baptists – 0.6%
Seventh-day Adventists – 0.1%
Evangelicals – 0.1%
Pentecostals – 0.1%
Catholics – 0.2%
Other – 2.0%
No Religion – 1.1%
Atheists – 0.2%

Economy
There are 12,555 businesses registered in the district. The share of agricultural land is 66,673 ha (74.7%) of total land area. The arable land occupies 52,161 ha (58.5%) of the total area of agricultural land: 2996 ha (3.4%), plantations of orchards, 3826 ha (4.3%) of vineyards, 4497 ha (5.0%) pastures, 335 ha (0.4%) others.

Education
The district Anenii Noi, 36 educational institutions operate. Total number of students: 10,867 students in schools, 120 children polyvalent vocational schools.
Currently the schools in the district operates 860 teachers.

Politics
Voters in the district Anenii Noi, said mainly center-right parties, particularly the AEI. PCRM the last three elections is in a continuous fall.

During the last three elections AEI had an increase of 79.7%

Elections

|-
!style="background-color:#E9E9E9" align=center colspan="2" valign=center|Parties and coalitions
!style="background-color:#E9E9E9" align=right|Votes
!style="background-color:#E9E9E9" align=right|%
!style="background-color:#E9E9E9" align=right|+/−
|-
| 
|align=left|Party of Communists of the Republic of Moldova
|align="right"|19,034
|align="right"|44.12
|align="right"|−3.80
|-
| 
|align=left|Liberal Democratic Party of Moldova
|align="right"|13,380
|align="right"|31.02
|align="right"|+12.98
|-
| 
|align=left|Democratic Party of Moldova
|align="right"|4,406
|align="right"|10,21
|align="right"|-0.84
|-
| 
|align=left|Liberal Party
|align="right"|3,292
|align="right"|7.63
|align="right"|−6.63
|-
|bgcolor=#0033cc|
|align=left|European Action Movement
|align="right"|763
|align="right"|1.76
|align="right"|+1.76
|-
| 
|align=left|Party Alliance Our Moldova
|align="right"|591
|align="right"|1.37
|align="right"|−3.76
|-
|bgcolor="grey"|
|align=left|Other Party
|align="right"|2,452
|align="right"|5.65
|align="right"|+2.05
|-
|align=left style="background-color:#E9E9E9" colspan="2"|Total (turnout 60.14%)
|width="30" align="right" style="background-color:#E9E9E9"|43,421
|width="30" align="right" style="background-color:#E9E9E9"|100.00
|width="30" align="right" style="background-color:#E9E9E9"|

Culture

The district Anenii Noi operates: 65 artistic, two art schools, 18 teams, holding the title of the band model, 37 public libraries.

Health
The district works: a hospital with general fund of 188 beds, a center of family doctors in the composition of which there are 16 offices of family doctors, 13 health centers, 11 health points. In health care population Anenii Noi District operates: 123 doctors, 356 average staff, nurses, 348 medical and auxiliary personnel.

External links

 Anenii Noi Official web-site
 Anenii Noi Consiliul web-site

References

Presentation of Anenii Noi District on the website of the Ministry of Local Public Administration of Moldova
 District population per year
 Anenii Noi
 Rezultatele alegerilor din 28 noiembrie 2010 în raionul Anenii Noi

 
Districts of Moldova